Christopher Knudsen (4 October 1843 – 28 July 1915) was a Norwegian priest and politician for the Conservative Party. He was Minister of Education and Church Affairs from 1905 to 1906.

Knudsen was born in Drammen as a son of railroad worker Knud Larssen (1814–66) and Marie A. Christophersen Aaserud (1812–1890). He was married twice; first from February 1869 to Marie Charlotte Andrea Hermanstorff (1849–1873), then from September 1874 to Ida Regine Lohne (1855–1949). He was an uncle of politician Knud Christian Knudsen.

He finished his secondary education in 1861, graduated with the cand.theol. degree in 1867, and in 1879 he became vicar in the newly established parish of Nedre Eiker. When Nedre Eiker became its own municipality in 1885, he sat in the municipal council and on the school board and was elected mayor. He left Nedre Eiker in 1886, and became a curate in Drammen. He was elected to the Parliament of Norway from that city in 1894 and 1897. He was then elected for a third term in 1900 from the constituency Tønsberg, where he had been appointed vicar.

On 11 March 1905, when Michelsen's Cabinet assumed office, Knudsen was appointed Norwegian Minister of Education and Church Affairs. This cabinet oversaw the dissolution of the union between Norway and Sweden in 1905. Knudsen left the cabinet on 26 January 1906.

References

1843 births
1915 deaths
Politicians from Drammen
University of Oslo alumni
Norwegian schoolteachers
Norwegian priest-politicians
Government ministers of Norway
Members of the Storting
Conservative Party (Norway) politicians
Mayors of places in Buskerud
Ministers of Education of Norway